Film Archives, Inc. or F.I.L.M. Archives (Fast Images Lotsa Movies) is a stock footage company based in New York City.

It is believed to be one of the oldest independent footage companies and has supplied footage to feature films, television, industrial, commercial, and web footage users.

Footage from its library of mostly vintage films has been featured in The Daily Show with Jon Stewart, The Tonight Show Starring Jimmy Fallon, and the feature films 42, Argo,  Dreamgirls and Trial of the Chicago 7.

History 

Film Archives was founded in 1986 by Mark Trost and Rick Scheckman, who had been collecting 16mm films as a hobby throughout the 1960s and 1970s, an era before the advent of home VCRs. When Trost was contacted by the producers of the ABC News series Our World with Linda Ellerbee for use of a clip from the 1938 Lone Ranger serial, the company notified other TV producers of their collection. Producers of Geraldo, Inside Edition and the Comedy Channel (precursor to Comedy Central) soon began incorporating clips from the company's collection into their programs.

In 1987, Film Archives began representing footage from  Cablevision's local all-news channel News 12 Long Island. Stories that originally ran on the channel were soon licensed for use by Dateline NBC, The Oprah Winfrey Show and Extra.

Company's major claim to television fame is being the source of David Letterman's favorite clip, Monkey Washes the Cat, which has since been replaced by a sneezing monkey (not provided by FILM Archives). The clip was featured as the "Moment of Zen" accompanying Jon Stewart's February 10 announcement that he would be retiring from The Daily Show. In addition, they licensed the rare short Mr. B Natural for use in Mystery Science Theater 3000 (MST3K). F.I.L.M. Archives is the only known holder of this film print today, archived as reel #1133B.

According to company records, the top five footage requests are:
1. Elvis Presley
2. Marilyn Monroe
3. John F. Kennedy
4. 1950s suburbia
5. World War II

Select client list 

TV Shows:

 America In Color
 American Horror Story: 1984
 American Masters
 Anthony Bourdain: Parts Unknown
 CBS Evening News
 CBS Sunday Morning
 The Colbert Report
 The Daily Show with Jon Stewart
 The Deuce
 Documentary Now!
 The Dr. Oz Show
 The 80s: The Decade That Made Us
 Entertainment Tonight
 Fast N' Loud
 Foo Fighters: Sonic Highways
 Going Clear: Scientology, Hollywood and the Prison of Belief
 The Goldbergs
 Good Morning America
 Inside Edition
 Key & Peele
 Kurt Cobain: Montage of Heck
 Late Show with David Letterman
 Mad Men
 Makers: Women Who Make America
 McMillions
 The Mentalist
 The Middle
 Mythbusters
 O.J.: Made in America
 Raising Hope
 Saturday Night Live
 Sinatra: All or Nothing at All
 South Park
 Succession
 The Tonight Show Starring Jimmy Fallon
 Transparent
 Tyrant

Films:

 The Age of Adaline
 Argo
 Battle of the Sexes
 Belushi
 Bridge of Spies
 Bowling for Columbine
 Capturing the Friedmans
 Chapter 27
 Charlie Wilson's War
 Chicago
 Couples Retreat
 Deli Man
 Dolemite Is My Name
 Dreamgirls 
 Fahrenheit 9/11
 42
 The Founder
 Foxcatcher
 Geostorm
 Ghost Ship
 Hollywoodland
 I'm Your Woman
 An Inconvenient Truth
 Pawn Sacrifice
 San Andreas
 Supermensch: The Legend of Shep Gordon
 Tab Hunter Confidential
 Tarnation
 Think Like A Man Too
 13th
 ‘’Trial of the Chicago 7’’
 Uncle Drew
 Watchmen
 What Happened, Miss Simone?
 Where's My Roy Cohn?
 World War Z

References

External links
 Film Archives, Inc.
 Film Archives Channel on YouTube

Mass media companies of the United States
Companies based in New York City